The Highlands County Courthouse (constructed in 1927) is a historic U.S. courthouse in Sebring, Florida. It is located at 430 South Commerce Avenue. On August 14, 1989, it was added to the U.S. National Register of Historic Places.

References

External links
 Highlands County listings, Florida's Office of Cultural and Historical Programs
 Highlands County Courthouse at Florida's Historic Courthouses
 Florida's Historic Courthouses by Hampton Dunn

County courthouses in Florida
Buildings and structures in Sebring, Florida
Courthouses on the National Register of Historic Places in Florida
1926 establishments in Florida
National Register of Historic Places in Highlands County, Florida